Mercianne Hendo (born 19 January 1997) is a Congolese handball player for DSGB Brazzaville and the Congolese national team.

She participated at the 2021 World Women's Handball Championship in Spain.

References

1997 births
Living people
Congolese female handball players